The 1974 CONCACAF Champions' Cup was the 10th edition of the annual international club football competition held in the CONCACAF region (North America, Central America and the Caribbean), the CONCACAF Champions' Cup. It determined that year's club champion of association football in the CONCACAF region and was played from 5 May till 27 October 1974 with all the matches played under the home/away match.

The teams were split in 3 zones (North American, Central American and Caribbean), each one qualifying the winner to the final tournament. As no clubs entered in the North American section, the winner of the two remaining zones gained the qualification to the final. Municipal from Guatemala won the tournament, becoming CONCACAF champion for the first time.

North American Zone
Entrants included: Devonshire Colts North Village CC Maccabi Los Angeles

As all clubs withdrew, the zone was cancelled.

Central American Zone

First round

Aurora FC won on lots.
 The 2nd leg of Alianza FC vs. Universidad Centroamericana was cancelled by mutual agreement, and the 1st leg results stood.
Aurora FC, Motagua, Municipal and Negocios Internacionales all advanced to the second round.

Second round

Alianza FC: Bye
Aurora FC advanced to the third round.

Third round

Municipal: Bye
Alianza FC advance to the fourth round.

Fourth round

Municipal advances to the CONCACAF Final.

Caribbean Zone

First round

           

Jong Colombia and Transvaal advance to second round.

Second round

 

Transvaal advances to the CONCACAF Final.

Final

First leg

Second leg 

Municipal won 4–0 on points, and 4–2 on goal difference.

Champion

References

1
CONCACAF Champions' Cup